KZLJ-LP (102.1 FM) is a radio station broadcasting a rhythmic AC format. Licensed to La Junta, Colorado, United States, the station is currently owned by Daniel Hyatt.

History
The station went on the air on March 28, 2014, after running a test signal for a few days.

External links
 

2014 establishments in Colorado
Rhythmic adult contemporary radio stations
ZLJ
Otero County, Colorado
Radio stations established in 2014
ZLJ-LP